Marco Ruiz may refer to:

 Marco Ruiz (golfer) (born 1974), Paraguayan golfer
 Marco Ruiz (footballer) (born 1979), Peruvian footballer
 Marco Antonio Ruiz (born 1969), retired Mexican footballer